Aldershot, Farnham and District Athletic Club is an athletics club based in Aldershot, Hampshire, England. The club are based at the Aldershot Military Stadium in Aldershot, Hampshire. AFD competes in the Youth Development League (YDL), Hampshire and Surrey Leagues, various relay events including the Southern Road Relays and National Road and Cross Country Relays.
The current president is Steve Smith and the current chairman is Michael Neighbour.

The middle/long distance coaching is currently led by former international athlete Mick Woods and the club trains its middle and long distance athletes at various locations including the polo fields opposite the Military Stadium on Queen's Avenue and The Wellington Statue, Aldershot.

The sprint section is led by various coaches and the race walking teams are run and trained by former Commonwealth Games athlete Verity Snook-Larby.

AFD was ranked number one statistically by Jegmar, making it the number one running club in the country for 2018.

History
The founding of Aldershot, Farnham and District Athletic Club on 7 August 1966.
Formally known as Aldershot and District A.C., the club eventually merged with Farnham A.C. The negotiations between Farnham, Guildford and Godalming A.C. stumbled over the inclusion of Godalming in the name. As the Guildford and Godalming clubs had previously merged about a decade before, they wished to include their name in full while Farnham thought the name in full would be 'too much of a mouthful'.

At the time, the Aldershot Club, whose colours were white with green hoops (the same as existing colours of AFD, minus the red of Farnham), were mainly a very strong ladies club with a newly emerging boys and youths section, which had just competed with distinction for the first time in the ECCU National at Graves Park, Sheffield. The ladies through Sheena Fitzmaurice, Pat Card and Margaret Bram had made an effective climb to the top of women's cross country. At the time the club had just received permission to organise its Sunday morning training at the Mons track at the back of the Military Stadium. Aldershot, for the first time, got permission to put on the annual Trophies Meetings at the Military Stadium and used the grass track at Aldershot Park for other matches.

Much of the club foundation came with the magnificent organisation of events for youngsters. In the early days of the club, AFD (as they are more commonly known) organised a Track and Field League and a Cross Country League for local school boys which was a great recruiting basis. They had indoor training at North Camp for the girls and St Michael's School for the boys under the superb direction of Tim Carroll. Visits from men who were to become world-famous but were AAA National coaches at the time – Ron Pickering, Tom McNab and John Anderson to name but a few were made.

AFD organised women's and youths and boys road relays in Aldershot which attracted huge entries and were the most popular in the country. As well as the schools they got great help from, the British Army helped and the club used Army Junior Units as venues for the Cross Country Leagues. In conjunction with the former Aldershot Borough Council, evening sports meeting were arranged which was often the introduction for young school children and young servicemen to the sport. The Aldershot Council also helped to buy an old Army hut which we re-erected in Aldershot Park as the club headquarters at the new grass track. The Aldershot Club was very much on the up and one of the most talked about clubs in the country.

The Farnham Club, whose colours were red, were mainly a harriers club based at the Memorial Ground in Farnham with its unique grass 300 yards track. The club organised a very popular Paarlauf each year, which always attracted International athletes. They also organised a very popular Cross Country Relay in Farnham Park which had a very good entry. The club was made up mainly of seniors with most of the administration undertaken by Alan Mason, who was one of the first coaches to go through the Loughborough Summer School under the legendary founder of the coaching system in Britain, Geoff Dyson. The leading athlete was Ron Stonehouse, who had the misfortune to be a contemporary of Brasher, Shirley, Disley, Chataway, Norris, Pirie and Driver and would in any other era have been one of the greats of the sport. Ron ran in the curtain up to the legendary Kuts/Chataway race which was run at White City.

The marriage was perfect with the merging of the young and enthusiastic Aldershot lads with the experienced Farnham seniors and in middle distance running our record in Southern Cross Country and Road Running since 1966 speaks for itself. AFD were the first club in the South to be equally strong in both women's and men's athletics. In the sixties and seventies the club developed an enormous amount of talent and with the founding of the League system, were soon to become a force in track and field as well as cross country and road running.

With the formation of the Rushmoor Borough Council from the former Aldershot and Farnborough Councils, they were later to get the financial support which enabled them to use the Military Stadium for training. In 1966 it cost committee members 2 shillings (10 pence) per week to keep the club going, and the members also paid 1 shilling (5 pence) for training. It was not unusual for AFD to fill a coach on a Sunday morning to visit Elvetham or Frensham for organised training.

Club links

2016 Tragedy
On the night of 8 November 2016 at around 7:10pm, two promising young athletes, Lucy Pygott, 17, and Stacey Burrows, 16, were killed by a drunk driver whilst crossing Queen's Avenue as they jogged from the stadium to begin their evening training session. Despite the best efforts of paramedics and the air ambulance crews to save the two girls, they were pronounced dead at the scene.

Lucy Pygott, who was from Hartley Wintney, represented Great Britain in July at the 2016 European Athletics Youth Championships in Tbilisi, Georgia, where she won a bronze medal in the Under 18 3000 metres. Stacey Burrows, who was from Farnborough, was the Hampshire Under 17 3000 metres champion.

In a statement, the club said:

Tributes were paid across the World, with most races including the Hampshire Cross Country League match in Bournemouth, the Start Fitness Metropolitan Cross Country League match in Stevenage and the British Athletics Cross Challenge fixture in Milton Keynes, the following weekend being preceded by a minutes silence and runners wearing black or AFD-coloured ribbons on their vests.

In Bournemouth, despite no longer running himself, AFD head coach Mick Woods completed a lap of the course in memory of his two athletes, while many AFD athletes ran and finished their races together. A minute's silence was also held at the Cross de Atapuerca in Spain, where Pygott had been due to race for England.

In Stevenage many runners ran with black ribbons on their wrists and vests and a minute's silence was held.

As well as this, athletics events in the summer held minute silences despite happening months after the tragic event.

The 24-year-old driver, later named as serving soldier, Michael Casey, who was found to be over the drink-drive limit, the speed limit and drove through red lights, admitted to death by dangerous driving by driving through red lights and was subsequently jailed for six years, disqualified from driving for 10 years and dismissed from the British Army.

Athletes nominated for the 2016 Athletics Weekly British Under 18 athlete of the year award paid further tribute to Stacey Burrows and Lucy Pygott by requesting that the award be made to the two talented teenage runners. Following the tragedy, Athletics Weekly was contacted by European youth 1500 metres silver medallist, Sabrina Sinha on behalf of her fellow award nominees who had come to the collective decision that they wished to see the honour jointly awarded to the two girls.

On 20 October 2018, a memorial bench and plaque dedicated to the memory of the girls were presented at the Aldershot Military Stadium.

Competition placings

National Cross Country Championships

Winners  

Senior men - 1983, 1984, 1985, 2010

Junior men - 1972, 1988, 1998, 2000, 2002, 2003, 2004, 2005, 2006, 2008, 2010, 2012, 2013, 2016, 2017

Under 17 men - 1994, 2001, 2007, 2008, 2009, 2012

Under 15 boys - 2003, 2009, 2013, 2018

Senior women - 1979, 1984, 2013, 2014, 2015, 2016, 2017

Junior women - 2004, 2005, 2008, 2009, 2010, 2011, 2012, 2013, 2014, 2015, 2017

Under 17 women - 1994, 2002, 2003, 2004, 2008, 2009, 2010, 2011, 2012, 2013, 2015, 2016

Under 15 girls - 1997, 2001, 2002, 2005, 2006, 2007, 2008, 2009, 2010, 2011, 2012, 2015

Under 13 girls - 1999, 2000, 2001, 2002, 2004, 2006, 2008, 2009

(updated        = 6 March 2018)

European Club Champions Cup Cross Country 
Men - 1984, 1985, 1986

Women - 1980, 1985, 2015, 2017

(updated        = 6 March 2017)

National Cross Country Relays

Winners  

Senior men - 2013, 2016

Under 20 men - 2010

Under 17 men - 2014, 2017

Under 15 boys - 2007, 2016, 2018

Under 13 boys - 2007, 2015, 2016

Senior women - 2013, 2014, 2016, 2017

Under 20 women - 2008, 2009, 2010, 2012, 2013, 2014

Under 17 women - 2006, 2007, 2008, 2009, 2010, 2015, 2016

Under 15 girls - 2007, 2008, 2009, 2010, 2011, 2012

Under 13 girls - 2006, 2007, 2008, 2009

(updated        = 5 November 2018)

National Road Relays

Winners  

Senior men (12 stage) - 1982, 2004

Senior women (6 stage) - 2008, 2010, 2011, 2012, 2013, 2014, 2015, 2016

Senior men (6 stage) - 1981, 2011, 2014

Senior women (4 stage) - 1971, 1972, 1981, 1986, 2007, 2008, 2009, 2010, 2011, 2012, 2013, 2014, 2016, 2017, 2018

Under 17 women - 1971, 1972, 1999, 2000, 2009, 2010, 2015, 2016

Under 15 girls - 1997, 1998, 2000, 2001, 2009, 2010, 2011

Under 13 girls - 1972, 1974, 1998, 1999, 2000, 2001, 2009

Under 17 men - 2017

Under 15 boys - 2001, 2018

Under 13 boys - 1999, 2000, 2001, 2017

(updated        = 24 October 2018)

Race Walking Champions Cup 20km

Winners  

Senior Ladies - 2013

Notable athletes

Olympians

(updated        = 3 October 2016)

Commonwealth Games 

(updated        = 3 October 2016)

References

External links
 Official club website
 Thames Valley Athletics Centre

Athletics clubs in England
1966 establishments in England